Five Bells (2011) is a novel by Australian author Gail Jones.

Plot summary 

Five Bells concerns four main characters who visit Circular Quay in Sydney on the same day: Ellie, a PhD student; James, a teacher; Catherine, an Irish woman mourning the loss of her brother; and Pei Xing, a Chinese woman.

Notes 

 Epigraph: "Memory believes before knowing remembers." - William Faulkner, Light in August

Where have you gone? The tide is over you,
The turn of midnight water's over you,
As Time is over you, and mystery,
And memory, the flood that does not flow.
–Kenneth Slessor, "Five Bells"

 "The first debt of this project is to Kenneth Slessor's elegiac poem, "Five Bells" (1939), which returned to me, like a remembered song, one midnight on a ferry in the centre of Circular Quay". (Author's acknowledgements: p. 217)

Reviews 

 Australian Book Review
 The Sydney Morning Herald

Awards and nominations 

 2012 shortlisted Indie Awards – Fiction
 2012 shortlisted Festival Awards for Literature (SA) – Award for Fiction
 2012 shortlisted ASAL Awards – ALS Gold Medal
 2012 shortlisted Barbara Jefferis Award
 2012 Nita Kibble Literary Award
 2013 longlisted International Dublin Literary Award

References

2011 Australian novels
Novels by Gail Jones
Novels set in Sydney
Vintage Books books